Mount Mulach is a mountain (1,080 m) standing 4 miles (6 km) northeast of Mount Draeger on the east side of Posey Range, Bowers Mountains, where it overlooks the Lillie Glacier. Mapped by United States Geological Survey (USGS) from ground surveys and U.S. Navy air photos, 1960–62. Named by Advisory Committee on Antarctic Names (US-ACAN) for Chief Electrician's Mate William J. Mulach, U.S. Navy, of the McMurdo Station winter party, 1967.

Mountains of Victoria Land
Pennell Coast